Get Along is the third DVD released by Canadian indie rock duo Tegan and Sara. It was released November 15, 2011 by Warner Bros. Records and was reissued on vinyl in April 2012. Get Along is a collection of three films and a live album.

The first film, States, is a 30-minute documentary that showcases American touring footage and interviews with Tegan and Sara, detailing the early stages of their career and interactions with their fans. The second film, India, is a 25-minute documentary shot during Tegan and Sara's tour of India, utilising interview footage with the band as well as their family and friends. The third film, For the Most Part, is a 70-minute stripped-down studio concert, shot before a live audience of 75 people over two days at The Warehouse Studios in Vancouver.

Get Along was nominated for Best Long Form Music Video at the 2013 Grammy Awards, but lost to Big Easy Express by Edward Sharpe and the Magnetic Zeros.

Track listing
The following is the track listing on the included live album.

Awards and nominations

Reception
Get Along has received mixed reviews. Allie Conti of Paste stated that "Get Along has something to offer everyone, no matter where they lie on the spectrum of fandom", while SheWired's Ariel Shepherd-Oppenheim stated that "overall, the films were a bit of a disappointment. I wanted to learn more about them, and I didn't really feel like I did." A review in Consequence of Sound criticised the repetitive nature of some of the included songs, but concluded that "...imperfections and the occasional lack of focus aside, Get Along is a thoughtful gift to (Tegan and Sara) fans, who will no doubt cherish it." James Christopher Monger of AllMusic wrote that the live album "finds the duo waltzing through its 15-year career with the kind of ease and amiable confidence that can only come from longtime friends who also happen to be siblings."

Charts

Release history

References

Tegan and Sara albums
2011 video albums
2011 live albums
Live video albums